Rinaldo may refer to:
Renaud de Montauban (also spelled Renaut, Renault, Italian: Rinaldo di Montalbano, Dutch: Reinout van Montalbaen, German: Reinhold von Montalban), a legendary knight in the medieval Matter of France
Rinaldo (Jerusalem Liberated), a character in a 1580 epic poem by Tasso
Rinaldo (opera), a 1711 Italian opera by George Frideric Handel, based on the above character
Rinaldo (cantata), an 1863 cantata by Johannes Brahms, based on the above character
HMS Rinaldo, one of four ships of the name launched between 1808 and 1943 by the Royal Navy

Books and films 
Rinaldo Rinaldini, the Robber Captain,  a 1797 novel by Christian August Vulpius
 Rinaldo Rinaldini (film), a 1927 film based on the book
 Rinaldo Rinaldini (TV series), a 1968 German television series later released in France as La kermesse des brigands

People with the name

Given name
Rinaldo (footballer, born 1966), full name Antônio Rinaldo Gonçalves, Brazilian football forward
Rinaldo (footballer, born 1975), full name Rinaldo Santana dos Santos, Brazilian football striker
Rinaldo Conti (1199 or c. 1185–1261), who later became Pope Alexander IV
Rinaldo de Lamare (1910–2002), Brazilian physician who specialized in pediatrics
Rinaldo Rigola (1868–1954), Italian politician

Surname
Giovanni Rinaldo (1720–1795), Count of Carli-Rubbi, Italian economist and antiquarian
Matthew John Rinaldo (1931–2008), United States Representative from New Jersey
Sandie Rinaldo (born 1950), Canadian television journalist and news anchor
Theodore Rinaldo (1944-2000), an American businessman, charismatic religious leader, and convicted child sex offender
Zac Rinaldo (born 1990), Canadian professional ice hockey player

See also
Monte Rinaldo, municipality in the province of Fermo, Italy

Rinaldi

it:Rinaldo